Kyle Grant Isbel (born March 3, 1997) is an American professional baseball center fielder for the Kansas City Royals of Major League Baseball (MLB). He made his MLB debut in 2021.

Amateur career
Isbel attended Etiwanda High School in Rancho Cucamonga, California, where he played baseball. As a junior, he hit .347. Following his junior year, he committed to play college baseball at the University of Nevada-Las Vegas (UNLV). Undrafted in the 2015 Major League Baseball draft, he enrolled at UNLV.

In 2016, Isbel's freshman season at UNLV, he hit .319 with one home run and 28 RBIs over 56 games, earning Mountain West Conference co-Freshman of the Year honors. That summer, he played in the California Collegiate League for the Santa Barbara Foresters. As a sophomore at UNLV in 2017, he played in 55 games, batting .290 with six home runs and 26 RBIs. Following the season, he played in the Cape Cod Baseball League with the Yarmouth–Dennis Red Sox, where he was named a league all-star. In 2018, his junior year, Isbel slashed .357/.441/.643 with 14 home runs and 56 RBIs over 59 games, earning All-MW First-Team honors. After the season, he was selected by the Kansas City Royals in the third round of the 2018 Major League Baseball draft.

Professional career
Isbel signed with the Royals and made his professional debut with the Idaho Falls Chukars before being promoted to the Lexington Legends. Over 64 games between the two clubs, Isbel hit .326 with seven home runs, 32 RBIs, and 24 stolen bases. In 2019, he began the year with the Wilmington Blue Rocks. He was placed on the injured list in April, and was activated in July. He appeared in seven rehab games before being reassigned to Wilmington. Over 52 games with the Blue Rocks, Isbel hit .216 with five home runs and 23 RBIs. He played in the Arizona Fall League for the Surprise Saguaros after the season, earning All-Star honors. He did not play a minor league game in 2020 due to the cancellation of the minor league season caused by the COVID-19 pandemic.

On March 31, 2021, Royals manager Mike Matheny announced the Isbel had made Kansas City's Opening Day roster and would be starting in right field. On April 1, he was selected to the 40-man roster. Isbel made his MLB debut the same day, collecting his first MLB hit, an RBI single off of Kyle Gibson of the Texas Rangers. He finished the game three for five with two RBIs.

References

External links

1997 births
Living people
People from Fontana, California
Baseball players from California
Major League Baseball outfielders
Kansas City Royals players
UNLV Rebels baseball players
Yarmouth–Dennis Red Sox players
Idaho Falls Chukars players
Lexington Legends players
Arizona League Royals players
Wilmington Blue Rocks players
Surprise Saguaros players